In abstract algebra, specifically the theory of Lie algebras, Serre's theorem states: given a (finite reduced) root system , there exists a finite-dimensional semisimple Lie algebra whose root system is the given .

Statement 

,
,
,
.
is a finite-dimensional semisimple Lie algebra with the Cartan subalgebra generated by 's and with the root system .

The square matrix  is called the Cartan matrix. The construction of a semisimple Lie algebra from a Cartan matrix can be generalized by weakening the definition of a Cartan matrix. The (generally infinite-dimensional) Lie algebra associated to a generalized Cartan matrix is called a Kac–Moody algebra.

Sketch of proof 
Let  and then let  be the Lie algebra generated by (1) the generators  and (2) the relations:
,
.

Consider the following representation of a Lie algebra:

, inductively,
, inductively.
It is not trivial that this is indeed a well-defined representation and that has to be checked by hand. From this representation, one deduces the following properties: let  (resp. ) the subalgebras of  generated by the 's (resp. the 's).
 (resp. ) is a free Lie algebra generated by the 's (resp. the 's).
As a vector space, .
 where  and, similarly, .
(root space decomposition) .

It follows that the sum of ideals intersecting  trivially, it itself intersects  trivially. Let  be the sum of all ideals intersecting  trivially. Then there is a vector space decomposition: . In fact, it is a -module decomposition. Let
.
 
where  (resp. ) are the subalgebras generated by the images of 's (resp. the images of 's).

References 

Theorems about algebras
Lie algebras